The 2018 Asian Boys' U18 Volleyball Championship was the 12th edition of the Asian Boys' U18 Volleyball Championship, a biennial international volleyball tournament organised by the Asian Volleyball Confederation (AVC) with Islamic Republic of Iran Volleyball Federation (IRIVF). The tournament was held in Tabriz, Iran from 29 June to 6 July 2018. The top four teams of the tournament qualified for the 2019 FIVB Volleyball Boys' U19 World Championship as the AVC representatives.

Players must be born on or after 1 January 2001. And they can enroll themselves maximum for one championship.

On 14 December 2020, the AVC announced that the 2020 Asian Boys' U18 Volleyball Championship which was originally the AVC qualifier for the 2021 FIVB Volleyball Boys' U19 World Championship was canceled due to COVID-19 pandemic and the top four teams of the tournament which had not yet qualified to the 2021 U19 World Championship qualified for the 2021 U19 World Championship as the AVC representatives.

Qualification
The 18 AVC member associations submitted their U18 boys' national team to the 2018 Asian U18 Championship. But, Uzbekistan later withdrew. The 17 AVC member associations were from 5 zonal associations, including, Central Asia (6 teams), East Asia (5 teams), Oceania (2 teams), Southeast Asia (2 teams) and West Asia (2 teams).

Qualified teams
The following teams qualified for the tournament.

Pools composition
This was the first Asian U18 Championship which used the new competition format. Following the 2017 AVC Board of Administration's unanimous decision, the new format saw teams were drawn into six pools up to the total amount of the participating teams. Each team as well as the hosts was assigned into a pool according to their final standing of the 2017 edition. As the three best ranked teams were drawn in the same pool A, the next best three contested pool B, the next best three contested pool C. But, Uzbekistan withdrew after the draw. Final standing of the 2017 edition are shown in brackets.

Venues
 Shahid Poursharifi Arena, Tabriz, Iran
 Shahid Aghdami Arena, Tabriz, Iran

Pool standing procedure
 Number of matches won
 Match points
 Sets ratio
 Points ratio
 If the tie continues as per the point ratio between two teams, the priority will be given to the team which won the last match between them. When the tie in points ratio is between three or more teams, a new classification of these teams in the terms of points 1, 2 and 3 will be made taking into consideration only the matches in which they were opposed to each other.

Match won 3–0 or 3–1: 3 match points for the winner, 0 match points for the loser
Match won 3–2: 2 match points for the winner, 1 match point for the loser

Preliminary round
All times are Iran Daylight Time (UTC+04:30).
Originally, the winners of pool D had to play against the third ranked team of pool E in the playoffs. However, due to the absence of Uzbekistan, there were only two teams in pool E, so the winners of pool D went directly to the round of 12.

Pool A

|}

|}

Pool B

|}

|}

Pool C

|}

|}

Pool D

|}

|}

Pool E

|}

|}

Pool F

|}

|}

Final round
All times are Iran Daylight Time (UTC+04:30).

Playoffs

|}

Round of 12

|}

5th–10th quarterfinals

|}

Quarterfinals

|}

15th–17th semifinal

|}

11th–14th semifinals

|}

5th–8th semifinals

|}

Semifinals

|}

15th place match

|}

13th place match

|}

11th place match

|}

9th place match

|}

7th place match

|}

5th place match

|}

3rd place match

|}

Final

|}

Final standing

Awards

Most Valuable Player
 Taito Mizumachi
Best Setter
 Taiga Itoyama
Best Outside Spikers
 Chang Hung-yeh
 Park Seung-su

Best Middle Blockers
 Alireza Abdollahi
 Riku Ito
Best Opposite Spiker
 Bardia Saadat
Best Libero
 Jang Ji-won

See also
2018 Asian Girls' U17 Volleyball Championship

References

External links
Official website
Squads

2018
Asian Boys' U18 Championship
International volleyball competitions hosted by Iran
2018 in Iranian sport
June 2018 sports events in Iran
July 2018 sports events in Iran